Belmont-Luthézieu is a former commune in the Ain department in eastern France. On 1 January 2019, it was merged into the new commune Valromey-sur-Séran.

Geography
The commune is 18 km north of Belley. There are several waterfalls, gorges and caves in a forested environment.

Population

History
The priory of Belmont was founded in 1110. It has been in the parish of Luthézieu since the 12th century.

Mayors

See also
Communes of the Ain department

References

Former communes of Ain
Populated places disestablished in 2019